The following outline is provided as an overview of and topical guide to Belgium:

Belgium – sovereign country located in northwest Europe.  It is a founding member of the European Union and hosts its headquarters, as well as those of other major international organizations, including NATO.

General reference

 Pronunciation:  
 Common English country name:  Belgium
 Official English country name:  The Kingdom of Belgium
 Common endonym(s):  
 Official endonym(s):  
 Adjectival(s): Belgian
 Demonym(s): Belgians
 Etymology: Name of Belgium
 International rankings of Belgium
 ISO country codes: BE, BEL, 056
 ISO region codes: See ISO 3166-2:BE
 Internet country code top-level domain: .be

Geography of Belgium 

Geography of Belgium
 Belgium is a:
 Country
 Developed country
 Nation state
 Sovereign state
 Member State of the European Union
 Location:
 Northern Hemisphere and Eastern Hemisphere
 Eurasia
 Europe
 Western Europe
 Time zone:  Central European Time (UTC+01), Central European Summer Time (UTC+02)
 Extreme points of Belgium
 High:  Signal de Botrange 
 Low:  North Sea 0 m
 Land boundaries:  1,385 km
 620 km
 450 km
 167 km
 148 km
 Coastline:  66.5 km
 Population of Belgium: 10,584,534(2007) - 76th most populous country
 Area of Belgium:  - 139th largest country
 Atlas of Belgium

Environment of Belgium 

Environment of Belgium
 Climate of Belgium
 Renewable energy in Belgium
 Geology of Belgium
 Protected areas of Belgium
 Biosphere reserves in Belgium
 National parks of Belgium
 Wildlife of Belgium
 Fauna of Belgium
 Birds of Belgium
 Mammals of Belgium

Natural geographic features of Belgium 

 Lakes of Belgium
 Rivers of Belgium
 World Heritage Sites in Belgium

Regions of Belgium

Ecoregions of Belgium 

List of ecoregions in Belgium

Administrative divisions of Belgium 

Administrative divisions of Belgium
 Regions of Belgium
 Provinces of Belgium
 Municipalities of Belgium

Regions of Belgium 

Regions of Belgium
Brussels-Capital Region
Flemish Region
Walloon Region

Provinces of Belgium 

Provinces of Belgium
Antwerp
Limburg
Flemish Brabant
East Flanders
West Flanders
Hainaut
Walloon Brabant	
Namur 	
Liège
Luxembourg

Municipalities of Belgium 

Municipalities of Belgium
 Capital of Belgium: Brussels
 Cities of Belgium

Belgium comprises 589 municipalities grouped into five provinces in each of two regions and into a third region, the Brussels-Capital Region, comprising 19 municipalities that do not belong to a province.

Demography of Belgium 

Demographics of Belgium

Government and politics of Belgium 

Politics of Belgium
 Form of government: federal parliamentary representative democratic constitutional monarchy
 Capital of Belgium: Brussels
 Elections in Belgium
 Political parties in Belgium
 Political scandals of Belgium

Branches of government

Government of Belgium

Executive branch of the government of Belgium 
 Head of state (ceremonial): King of the Belgians, Filip I
 Head of government: Prime Minister of Belgium, Alexander De Croo
 Cabinet of Belgium

Legislative branch of the government of Belgium 

 Belgian Federal Parliament (bicameral)
 Upper house: Belgian Senate
 Lower house: Belgian Chamber of Representatives

Judicial branch of the government of Belgium 

 Court of Cassation

Foreign relations of Belgium 

Foreign relations of Belgium
 Diplomatic missions in Belgium
 Diplomatic missions of Belgium

International organization membership 
The Kingdom of Belgium is a member of:

African Development Bank Group (AfDB) (nonregional member)
Asian Development Bank (ADB) (nonregional member)
Australia Group
Bank for International Settlements (BIS)
Benelux Economic Union (Benelux)
Confederation of European Paper Industries (CEPI)
Council of Europe (CE)
Economic and Monetary Union (EMU)
Euro-Atlantic Partnership Council (EAPC)
European Bank for Reconstruction and Development (EBRD)
European Investment Bank (EIB)
European Organization for Nuclear Research (CERN)
European Space Agency (ESA)
European Union (EU)
Food and Agriculture Organization (FAO)
Group of 9 (G9)
Group of Ten (G10)
Inter-American Development Bank (IADB)
International Atomic Energy Agency (IAEA)
International Bank for Reconstruction and Development (IBRD)
International Chamber of Commerce (ICC)
International Civil Aviation Organization (ICAO)
International Criminal Court (ICCt)
International Criminal Police Organization (Interpol)
International Development Association (IDA)
International Energy Agency (IEA)
International Federation of Red Cross and Red Crescent Societies (IFRCS)
International Finance Corporation (IFC)
International Fund for Agricultural Development (IFAD)
International Hydrographic Organization (IHO)
International Labour Organization (ILO)
International Maritime Organization (IMO)
International Mobile Satellite Organization (IMSO)
International Monetary Fund (IMF)
International Olympic Committee (IOC)
International Organization for Migration (IOM)
International Organization for Standardization (ISO)
International Red Cross and Red Crescent Movement (ICRM)
International Telecommunication Union (ITU)

International Telecommunications Satellite Organization (ITSO)
International Trade Union Confederation (ITUC)
Inter-Parliamentary Union (IPU)
Multilateral Investment Guarantee Agency (MIGA)
North Atlantic Treaty Organization (NATO)
Nuclear Energy Agency (NEA)
Nuclear Suppliers Group (NSG)
Organisation internationale de la Francophonie (OIF)
Organisation for Economic Co-operation and Development (OECD)
Organization for Security and Cooperation in Europe (OSCE)
Organisation for the Prohibition of Chemical Weapons (OPCW)
Organization of American States (OAS) (observer)
Paris Club
Permanent Court of Arbitration (PCA)
Schengen Convention
Southeast European Cooperative Initiative (SECI) (observer)
United Nations (UN)
United Nations Conference on Trade and Development (UNCTAD)
United Nations Educational, Scientific, and Cultural Organization (UNESCO)
United Nations High Commissioner for Refugees (UNHCR)
United Nations Industrial Development Organization (UNIDO)
United Nations Interim Force in Lebanon (UNIFIL)
United Nations Mission in the Sudan (UNMIS)
United Nations Organization Mission in the Democratic Republic of the Congo (MONUC)
United Nations Relief and Works Agency for Palestine Refugees in the Near East (UNRWA)
United Nations Truce Supervision Organization (UNTSO)
United Nations University (UNU)
West African Development Bank (WADB) (nonregional)
Western European Union (WEU)
World Confederation of Labour (WCL)
World Customs Organization (WCO)
World Federation of Trade Unions (WFTU)
World Health Organization (WHO)
World Intellectual Property Organization (WIPO)
World Meteorological Organization (WMO)
World Trade Organization (WTO)
Zangger Committee (ZC)

Law and order in Belgium 

Law of Belgium
 Capital punishment in Belgium
 Constitution of Belgium
 Crime in Belgium
 Human rights in Belgium
 LGBT rights in Belgium
 Freedom of religion in Belgium
 Law enforcement in Belgium

Military of Belgium 

Military of Belgium
 Command
 Commander-in-chief: Gerard Van Caelenberge
 Defence minister: Steven Vandeput
 Ministry of Defence of Belgium
 Forces
 Army of Belgium
 Navy of Belgium
 Air Force of Belgium
 Special forces of Belgium
 Military history of Belgium
 Military ranks of Belgium

Local government in Belgium 

Local government in Belgium

History of Belgium 

History of Belgium
Timeline of the history of Belgium
Current events of Belgium
 Military history of Belgium

Culture of Belgium 

Culture of Belgium
 Architecture of Belgium
Neoclassical architecture in Belgium
 Cuisine of Belgium
 Festivals in Belgium
 Languages of Belgium
 Media in Belgium
 National symbols of Belgium
 Coat of arms of Belgium
 Flag of Belgium
 National anthem of Belgium
 People of Belgium
 Prostitution in Belgium
 Public holidays in Belgium
 Records of Belgium
 Religion in Belgium
 Buddhism in Belgium
 Christianity in Belgium
 Hinduism in Belgium
 Islam in Belgium
 Judaism in Belgium
 Sikhism in Belgium
 World Heritage Sites in Belgium

Art in Belgium 
 Art in Belgium
 Cinema of Belgium
 Literature of Belgium
 Music of Belgium
 Television in Belgium
 Theatre in Belgium

Sports in Belgium 

Sports in Belgium
 Football in Belgium
 Belgium at the Olympics

Economy and infrastructure of Belgium 

Economy of Belgium
 Economic rank, by nominal GDP (2007): 19th (nineteenth)
 Agriculture in Belgium
 Banking in Belgium
 National Bank of Belgium
 Communications in Belgium
 Internet in Belgium
 Companies of Belgium
Currency of Belgium: Euro (see also Euro topics)
ISO 4217: EUR
 Energy in Belgium
 Energy policy of Belgium
 Oil industry in Belgium
 Health care in Belgium
 Mining in Belgium
 Belgium Stock Exchange
 Tourism in Belgium
 Transport in Belgium
 Airports in Belgium
 Rail transport in Belgium
 Roads in Belgium
 Water supply and sanitation in Belgium

Education in Belgium 

Education in Belgium

See also 

Belgium

Index of Belgium-related articles
List of Belgium-related topics
List of international rankings
Member state of the European Union
Member state of the North Atlantic Treaty Organization
Member state of the United Nations
Outline of Europe
Outline of geography

References

External links

 Belgium, entry on the Catholic Encyclopedia 1913, republished on Wikisource
 Official site of Belgian monarchy
 Official site of the Belgian federal government
 Official Site of the Belgian Tourist Office in the Americas and GlobeScope
 History of Belgium: Primary Documents EuroDocs: Online Sources for European History
 Local news and features on Belgium, Expatica

Belgium
Belgium